Non-Orphanage, also known as Non-Children’s Community is a 2022 Russian teen drama film directed by Mikhail Raskhodnikov. It was theatrically released on September 15, 2022.

Plot 
The film takes place in an orphanage visited by the new director Andrei Must together with a new pupil named Inna, who quickly adapts to a new environment filled with children who are dissatisfied with local conditions and are preparing a riot to show the educators who is the boss here.

Cast 
 Ivan Okhlobystin as Andrei Must
 Alexandr Panin as Litva
 Polina Vataga as Inna
 Irina Rozanova as a psychologist
 Yekaterina Solomatina as deputy director
 Alexandra Skachkova as a teacher
 Oleg Vasilkov as a district police officer
 Marina Kleshyova a nurse
 Arsen Sukhovsky as Kondrat
 Iosif Medvedev as Molchun

References 

2022 films
2020s Russian-language films
2020s teen drama films
Russian teen drama films